The Central Conference of American Rabbis (CCAR), founded in 1889 by Rabbi Isaac Mayer Wise, is the principal organization of Reform rabbis in the United States and Canada. The CCAR is the largest and oldest rabbinical organization in the world. Its current president is Lewis Kamrass.

Rabbi Hara Person is the Chief Executive.

Overview
The CCAR primarily consists of rabbis educated at Hebrew Union College-Jewish Institute of Religion, located in Cincinnati, Ohio, New York City, Los Angeles, and Jerusalem. The CCAR also offers membership to those who have graduated in Europe from the Leo Baeck College in London (United Kingdom) and the Abraham Geiger College at the University of Potsdam (Germany), and others who joined the Reform movement after being ordained. Most of the last group graduated from either the Conservative Jewish Theological Seminary or the Reconstructionist Rabbinical College.

The CCAR issues responsa, resolutions, and platforms, but in keeping with the principles of Reform Judaism, their positions are non-binding on individual rabbis or congregations. It is also the publisher of CCAR Journal, a journal of Reform Judaism published quarterly. The group also runs the CCAR Press, a large publishing house that produces Reform siddurim, machzorim, and haggadot with a mixture of Hebrew and English. The most well-known CCAR prayerbooks include Gates of Prayer, Gates of Repentance, and the recently published Mishkan T'filah.

The CCAR in 1937 wrote the Columbus Platform as an official platform of the American Reform movement. The CCAR rewrote its principles in 1976 with its Centenary Perspective and rewrote them again in the 1999 as A Statement of Principles for Reform Judaism. According to the CCAR, personal autonomy still has precedence over these platforms.

Rabbi Bernard Bamberger of Temple Shaaray Tefila on New York's Upper East Side served as president of the CCAR in 1959–61.

In 1964, the CCAR began to take an official position opposing the American war in Vietnam, and in 1972 it began to refuse to pay the federal excise tax on telephone service as a protest against that war.

In 1983, the CCAR took one of its most controversial stands and formally affirmed that a Jewish identity can be passed down through either the mother or the father, if the child is raised with a Jewish identity.

In 2003, Rabbi Janet Marder became the first female president of the CCAR; this made her the first woman to lead a major rabbinical organization and the first woman to lead any major Jewish co-ed religious organization in the United States.

Rabbi Jonathan Stein, of Temple Shaaray Tefila, served as president of the CCAR in 2011–13.

In 2014, the CCAR joined a lawsuit challenging North Carolina's ban on same-sex marriage, which was America's first faith-based challenge to same-sex marriage bans.

In 2015, Denise Eger became the first openly gay president of the CCAR.

Criticism 
In the 1980s, CCAR began to examine sexual misconduct among its member rabbis. According to several sources, the initial committee was jokingly referred to [implicitly by rabbis within CCAR] as the "well-oiled zipper committee." In the ensuing decades, a formal Ethics Committee was established, but investigations were slow and rabbis were privately reprimanded and faced little to no consequences for their actions. A 1996 Jewish Telegraphic Agency (JTA) report covered the slow process and lack of serious consequences or standards for holding offending rabbis accountable, with one Reform rabbi stating, "when we deal with the difficult issues of rabbinic sexual misconduct, we have not taken seriously our own tradition.”

Since the 1996 JTA investigation, a number of prominent cases have drawn media attention and public criticism for their illustration of these concerns. In 2015, a CCAR member rabbi was expelled for sexual misconduct, but his community was not informed. In 2014, a senior rabbi of a Texas synagogue was reprimanded for sexual misconduct and allowed to move to another senior rabbi position in North Carolina, where he was censured for sexual misconduct within 36 months of his new placement, and neither congregation was alerted to the allegations.

In 2021, the CCAR hired a legal firm to investigate its ethics processes and to make recommendations for improvements. However, the recommendations were criticized as not sufficiently addressing survivors' and whistleblowers' concerns, including allowing for the continued use of untrained lay investigators and for allowing fellow rabbis to serve as rehabilitators who could determine whether an offender is fit to return to the pulpit.

According to an email from the 2018 Ethics Chair, CCAR rabbis are not expelled unless they fail to cooperate with the ethics process or are unable to perform their duties. As of January 2022, the only rabbi expelled who did not resign during the pendency of their ethics process or suspension was a rabbi who failed to comply with the terms of his suspension.

Survivors of sexual misconduct by CCAR member rabbis have described experiences that include grooming and emotional, psychological, and spiritual manipulation, sexual coercion, assault, and rape, emotional and sexual abuse, financial coercion, and trafficking.

List of Presidents 

 Isaac M. Wise: 1889-1900
 Joseph Silverman: 1900-1903
 Joseph Krauskopf: 1903-1905
 Joseph Stolz: 1905-1907
 David Philipson: 1907-1909
 Maximilian Heller: 1909-1911
 Samuel Schulman: 1911-1913
 Moses J. Gries: 1913-1915
 William Rosenau: 1915-1917
 Louis Grossmann: 1917-1919
 Leo M. Franklin: 1919-1921
 Edward N. Calish: 1921-1923
 Abram Simon: 1923-1925
 Louis Wolsey: 1925-1927
 Hyman G. Enelow: 1927-1929
 David Lefkowitz: 1929-1931
 Morris Newfield: 1931-1933
 Samuel H. Goldenson: 1933-1935
 Felix A. Levy: 1935-1937
 Max C. Currick: 1937-1939
 Emil W. Leipziger: 1939-1941
 James G. Heller: 1941-1943
 Solomon B. Freehof: 1943-1945
 Abba Hillel Silver: 1945-1947
 Abraham J. Feldman: 1947-1949
 Jacob R. Marcus: 1949-1951
 Philip S. Bernstein: 1951-1953
 Joseph L. Fink: 1953-1955
 Barnett R. Brickner: 1955-1957
 Israel Bettan:1957
 Jacob Philip Rudin: 1957-1959
 Bernard J. Bamberger: 1959-1961
 Albert G. Minda: 1961-1963
 Leon I. Feuer: 1963-1965
 Jacob J. Weinstein: 1965-1967
 Levi A. Olan: 1967-1969
 Roland B. Gittlesohn: 1969-1971
 David Polish: 1971-1973
 Robert I. Kahn: 1973-1975
 Arthur J. Lelyveld: 1975-1977
 Ely E. Pilchik: 1977-1979
 Jerome R. Malino: 1979-1981
 Herman E. Schaalman: 1981-1983
 W. Gunther Plaut: 1983-1985
 Jack Stern: 1985-1987
 Eugene J. Lipman: 1987-1989
 Samuel E. Karff: 1989-1991
 Walter Jacob: 1991-1993
 Sheldon Zimmerman: 1993-1995
 Simeon J. Maslin: 1995-1997
 Richard N. Levy: 1997-1999
 Charles A. Kroloff: 1999-2001
 Martin S. Weiner: 2001-2003
 Janet Marder: 2003-2005
 Harry Danziger: 2005-2007
 Peter Knobel: 2007-2009
 Ellen Weinberg Dreyfus: 2009-2011
 Jonathan Stein: 2011-2013
 Richard A. Block: 2013-2015
 Denise L. Eger: 2015-2017
 David Stern: 2017-2019
 Ronald Segal: 2019-2021
 Lewis Kamrass: 2021-

References

External links
Central Conference of American Rabbis
Central Conference of American Rabbis Press
Reform Judaism Home Page

Religious organizations established in 1889
Union for Reform Judaism
Rabbinical organizations
American tax resisters
Jews and Judaism in Cincinnati
Reform Judaism in Ohio